Hemitriccus is a genus of small South American birds in the family Tyrannidae. They are commonly known as tody-tyrants or bamboo tyrants, but the former name is (or was) also shared with several members of the genus Poecilotriccus. Several species from the genus Hemitriccus are very similar, and consequently best separated by their voice.

Species
It contains the following 22 species:
 Snethlage's tody-tyrant, Hemitriccus minor
 Boat-billed tody-tyrant, Hemitriccus josephinae
 Flammulated bamboo tyrant, Hemitriccus flammulatus
 Drab-breasted bamboo tyrant, Hemitriccus diops
 Brown-breasted bamboo tyrant, Hemitriccus obsoletus
 White-eyed tody-tyrant, Hemitriccus zosterops
 Zimmer's tody-tyrant, Hemitriccus minimus
 Eye-ringed tody-tyrant, Hemitriccus orbitatus
 Johannes's tody-tyrant, Hemitriccus iohannis
 Stripe-necked tody-tyrant, Hemitriccus striaticollis
 Hangnest tody-tyrant, Hemitriccus nidipendulus
 Yungas tody-tyrant, Hemitriccus spodiops
 Pearly-vented tody-tyrant, Hemitriccus margaritaceiventer
 Pelzeln's tody-tyrant, Hemitriccus inornatus
 Black-throated tody-tyrant, Hemitriccus granadensis
 Buff-throated tody-tyrant, Hemitriccus rufigularis
 Cinnamon-breasted tody-tyrant, Hemitriccus cinnamomeipectus
 Buff-breasted tody-tyrant, Hemitriccus mirandae
 Kaempfer's tody-tyrant, Hemitriccus kaempferi
 Fork-tailed tody-tyrant, Hemitriccus furcatus
 White-bellied tody-tyrant, Hemitriccus griseipectus
 Acre tody-tyrant, Hemitriccus cohnhafti

References

 
Bird genera
Taxonomy articles created by Polbot